The Southland School District, Independent School District 500, is a comprehensive community public school district in Mower County of southeastern Minnesota, United States, covering an area of approximately .

The district was established in 1971 by the consolidation of three previously separate school districts in Adams, Elkton and Rose Creek. Each one of the original districts operated their own elementary and high schools until 1973, when responsibilities were divided to serve grades 1-6 in Rose Creek, grades 7 and 8 in Elkton and grades 9-12 in Adams.

Schools
Schools in the district (with 2005-06 enrollment data) are:

Early Childhood PreSchool Center
Early Childhood Center in Adams, offering classes Birth-5. 30+ students.
 

Elementary School
Southland Elementary School 
in Rose Creek, Minnesota.
 Grades K-5. 
 350+ students.
Brian Schoen, Principal

Middle School
Southland Middle School
in Adams, Minnesota.
 Grades 6-8. 
400+ students
Scott Hall, Principal

High School
Southland Senior High School 
in Adams, Minnesota
Grades 9-12. 
400+ students
Scott Hall, Principal

References

External links
Southland School District

Education in Mower County, Minnesota
School districts in Minnesota
School districts established in 1971